Shamsher Singh Dullo, is an Indian politician and former Rajya Sabha M.P.

Early life
Shamsher Singh Dullo was born in Ramdasia Sikh family to Inder Singh Dullo and Satnam Kaur at Khanna, Punjab. He did B.A and LL.B from A.S. College, Khanna and Law College, Panjab University (Chandigarh) and practiced law from the Punjab and Haryana High Court.

His son Bandeep Singh Dullo and wife Harbans Kaur are member of Aam Admi Party. She was also an MLA from Khanna.

Politics
He became Member of Legislative Assembly twice in 1980 and 1992 from Khanna and served as Minister of state for Excise and Taxation.

He was elected in 13th Lok Sabha elections from Ropar Constituency.

He is former president of Punjab Pradesh Congress Committee and Metropolitan Council of Khanna. Also served as director in Bank of India and was member of senate in Guru Nanak Dev University, Amritsar.

In 2016, he was nominated as Rajya Sabha candidate from Punjab in the biennial elections.

References 

Indian National Congress politicians from Punjab, India
1947 births
Living people
Rajya Sabha members from Punjab, India
India MPs 1999–2004
Lok Sabha members from Punjab, India
People from Rupnagar district